
Gmina Łabiszyn is an urban-rural gmina (administrative district) in Żnin County, Kuyavian-Pomeranian Voivodeship, in north-central Poland.

Villages
Apart from the town of Łabiszyn, Gmina Łabiszyn contains the villages and settlements of Annowo, Antoniewo, Buszkowo, Jabłówko, Jabłowo Pałuckie, Jeżewice, Jeżewo, Kąpie, Klotyldowo, Łabiszyn-Wieś, Lubostroń, Nowe Dąbie, Obielewo, Obórznia, Ojrzanowo, Oporówek, Oporowo, Ostatkowo, Pszczółczyn, Rzywno, Smerzyn, Smogorzewo, Wielki Sosnowiec, Władysławowo, Wyręba, Załachowo and Zdziersk.

Neighbouring gminas
Gmina Łabiszyn is bordered by the gminas of Barcin, Białe Błota, Nowa Wieś Wielka, Szubin, Złotniki Kujawskie and Żnin.

References
Polish official population figures 2006

Labiszyn
Żnin County